The history of the Iranian Air Force, currently known as the Islamic Republic of Iran Air Force, can be divided into two phases—before the Islamic Revolution, and after it.

Imperial era 

The Imperial Iranian Air Force (IIAF) was a branch of the Imperial Iranian Armed Forces and was established by Reza Shah, the Shah of Iran, in 1920. It became operational with its first fully trained pilots on February 25, 1925. Iran's first attempt to procure aircraft from the United States in the 1920s failed due to Washington's refusal to supply equipment because of a World War I  treaty. Until World War II, the IIAF's aircraft inventory consisted entirely of European aircraft, mainly British and German. However, following a coordinated British and Soviet invasion of Iran during World War II in response to Reza Shah's declaration of neutrality, the IIAF's bases were occupied by the Allies and all existing IIAF aircraft were either destroyed or dismantled by the Soviet and British military. A few Iranian planes did manage to get airborne during the invasion and engaged the Royal Air Force (RAF) in dogfights, in which the RAF emerged victorious.

A roughly 1946 order of battle for the Air Force can be found in Jane's Fighting Aircraft of World War II. Two regiments were both reported to be based near Tehran. After World War II, the IIAF began to slowly rebuild its inventory, with aircraft mainly supplied by the United States and Great Britain. A national, aerobatic display team was formed in 1958. Called "Golden Crown", and a part of the IIAF, this lasted until 1978. Lieutenant General Nader Jahanbani is credited with establishing the Golden Crown and is generally considered the "Father of IIAF".  

In the 1960s, the IIAF acquired 90 Canadair Sabre fighters from the RCAF, but they were flipped over to the Pakistan Air Force.

In the 1960s and 1970s, the air force was used as part of a joint, aerial espionage programme of Iran and the United States, against the former-Soviet Union. This was in two parts, known as Project Dark Gene and Project Ibex.

The IIAF deployed aircraft to Oman in the 1970s, when Iran provided military assistance to that country, during the Dhofar rebellion. During this conflict, one Iranian F-4 Phantom II was shot down by rebels.

In 1976, the Imperial Iranian Air Force responded to a UFO incident over the Iranian capital, Tehran.

Later in the 1970s, the IIAF became the only military force other than the United States Navy to be equipped with the F-14 Tomcat. Consequently, it also became the only other operator of the AIM-54 Phoenix air-to-air missile. After the 1979 Iranian revolution, some of these planes were not in working order due to a lack of necessary spare parts, because of an American arms embargo and damage sustained on the aircraft during the Iraqi invasion (Iran–Iraq War). Some were brought back into service, due to localised production of reverse-engineered, Iranian-made, spare parts, as well as "cannibalism" (the process of taking working parts from damaged aircraft and using them to repair others).

During this era, the United States instituted the "Spellout", "Peace Ruby" and "Peace Net" programmes to upgrade the air-defence system of Iran. As well as air defence radars, the network was linked using microwave and troposcatter communications networks.

The IIAF had also placed an order for over 150 F-16 Fighting Falcon fighter aircraft in 1976, but deliveries were never made, due to the overthrow of the Shah by Ayatollah Khomeni in the revolution. These aircraft would go on to serve in the Israeli Air Force.

Post-Islamic Revolution
The overthrow of the Shah in the Islamic Revolution of February 1979, was followed by changes to the organization of the Iranian military. The air force was renamed the Islamic Republic of Iran Air Force (IRIAF), and largely inherited the equipment and structure of the former IIAF. Due to strained relations with the west, Iran had to procure new equipment from Brazil, the Soviet Union/Russia and the People's Republic of China.

However, it lost most of its leading officers in the course of post-revolutionary chaos, as well as due to the prosecution of those considered as loyal to the Shah, pro-U.S. or elsewhere by the new government in Tehran.  Its other personnel were also decimated by the purges, with many pilots removed or leaving the air force.  This left the air force ill-prepared for the Iran–Iraq War.

Iran–Iraq War 

A series of purges and forced retirements, as a consequence of the 1979 Iranian Revolution, resulted in the manpower of the service being halved between February 1979 and July 1980, leaving the IRIAF ill-prepared for the Iran–Iraq War (also called the "1st Persian Gulf War"). The sudden Iraqi air strikes against six Iranian airfields and four other military installations, launched on the afternoon of 22 September 1980, came as a complete surprise and caused a shock in the renamed "IRIAF", which was in the midst of reorganizing following the Iranian revolution which had ended 1 year earlier. Nevertheless, the Islamic Republic of Iran Air Force retaliated, flying strikes involving up to 146 fighter-bombers against Iraqi airfields, oil industry installations, and communications sites. In addition to striking Iraqi airfields, the IRIAF succeeded in damaging Iraqi oil-producing and exporting facilities; resulting in Baghdad's decision to stop all oil exports for several years.

Following a one-week-long counter-air campaign, and due to a critical situation on the ground in Khuzestan Province, the IRIAF was thrown into the land-battle, mainly in the areas of Khorramshahr, Ahvaz, and Dezful. Here, the IRIAF's performance surprised most informed observers, with air strikes against armour and supply columns. Due to heavy losses in troops and armour, Iranian air superiority and an interruption of supply systems, the Iraqis had to stop their offensive, and then became involved in extremely bitter land-battles against Iranian ground forces.

However, the IRIAF paid a heavy price for this success, losing dozens of its best pilots and aircraft in the period between September and December 1980.  Although the readiness rates of the IRIAF significantly increased in the following months, its overall role and influence declined, as the clerical government searched to put the emphasis in fighting on the Islamic Revolutionary Guard Corps (IRGC) militias, but also attempted to develop a separate air arm for this service.

After the successful liberation of most Iranian areas captured by the Iraqis, in late spring 1982, the situation of the IRIAF changed completely. From an air arm that was offensive by nature, it was largely relegated to air defense and, relatively seldom, tasks of flying bombing attacks against targets of industrial and military significance inside Iraq. Simultaneously, the IRIAF had to learn to maintain and keep operational its large fleet of U.S.-built aircraft and helicopters without outside help, due to American sanctions. Reaching back on equipment purchased from the U.S.A. in the 1970s, the Iranians began establishing their own aerospace industry; their efforts in this remained largely unrecognized until recently.

However, the IRIAF was able to obtain limited amounts of spare parts and weapons for its American-made aircraft, when Iran was able to buy American spare parts and weapons for its armed forces, during the Iran–Contra affair. Deliveries came via Israel and later, from the USA.

From 1984 and 1985, the IRIAF found itself confronted by an ever-better organized and equipped opponent, as the Iraqi Air force—reinforced by deliveries of advanced fighter-bombers from France and the Soviet Union—launched numerous offensives against Iranian population centres, industrial infrastructures, powerplants, and oil-export hubs. These became better known as "The Tanker War" and "The War of the Cities". To defend against an increasing number of Iraqi air strikes, the IRIAF leaned heavily on its large fleet of Grumman F-14 Tomcat air superiority fighters. Tomcats were mainly deployed in defense of the strategically important Kharg Island (main hub for Iranian oil exports), and Tehran. Over 300 air-to-air engagements against IQAF fighters, fighter-bombers, and bombers, were fought in these areas alone between 1980 and 1988.

Confronted with the fact that it could not obtain replacements for equipment lost in what became a war of attrition against Iraq, for the rest of the conflict, the IRIAF remained defence-orientated, conserving its surviving assets as a "force in being". From mid 1987, the IRIAF found itself confronted also with U.S. Navy fighters over the Persian Gulf. A number of confrontations that occurred between July 1987 and August 1988, stretched available IRIAF assets to the limit, exhausting its capability to defend Iranian air space against Iraqi air strikes.

Post Iran–Iraq War

Immediately after the end of the Iran–Iraq War, the IRIAF was partially re-built by limited purchases of MiG-29 fighters and Su-24 bombers from the Soviet Union, as well as F-7M and FT-7 fighters from China. While a welcome reinforcement, these types never replaced the older, U.S.-built F-4 Phantoms or F-14 Tomcats (now the only air arm in the world to continue using the fighter), or even Northrop F-5 Tiger IIs. Instead, the IRIAF continued efforts to maintain these types in service, and began a number of projects with the intention to refurbish and upgrade them.

A Russian attempt to sell a large number of MiG-27s, MiG-31s, and Tupolev Tu-22Ms to Iran, launched in 1993, was spoiled by a lack of interest and money on the part of Iran.

Iraqi aircraft from the Persian Gulf War
Following an alleged agreement (no proof exists for it) between the regimes in Baghdad and Tehran, in February 1991 a significant number of Iraqi Air Force (IrAF) aircraft were evacuated to Iranian airfields, to avoid destruction in the 1991 Persian Gulf War. The agreement was for Iran to return them after the war, but the Iranians impounded these aircraft instead, claiming them as war reparations for the Iran–Iraq War.

The IRIAF has pressed into service all of the 36 Su-24MKs, 7 SU-25s and 24 Mirage F.1BQs and F.1EQs flown from Iraq, while all the other types—including 40 Su-20/22s and at least ten MiG-23s of various versions—were stored.

Present

The exact current composition of the IRIAF is hard to determine, but estimates do exist. Many aircraft belonging to the Iraqi Air Force took refuge in Iran during the Persian Gulf War in 1991, and many were put into service with the IRIAF or taken apart for spare parts.

Due to the continuous spare parts shortages faced by the air force, a decision was made in the late 1980s to develop a local aerospace industry to support the air force.

In 2002, Iran with the co-operation of Ukraine, successfully started the manufacture of the Iran-140; a licence-built version of the Antonov An-140 transport aircraft. Simultaneously, Iran began construction of two 100% domestically produced fighters, upgraded using technology from the F-14 Tomcat and the F-5 Tiger II. The fighters have been named the Azarakhsh and the Shafaq.

Since then the country has also become self-sufficient in the manufacture of helicopters. The country claims that it is capable of producing the old U.S. AH-1 Cobra gunship. Additionally, Iran also produces Bell Helicopter Bell 212 and Bell 206 helicopters in serial production. These are known respectively as the Shabaviz 2-75 and the Shabaviz 206.

Notable pilots 
Unlike many other nations with modern air forces, Iran was engaged in an intense and protracted war. The 8 year long conflict with Iraq gave the IRIAF the opportunity to develop some battle-tested and hardened fighter pilots. Though information about the IRIAF is, at best, hard to access, two men stand out as the best Iranian fighter aces.

Jalil Zandi is Iran's most successful fighter pilot. Flying the American made F-14 Tomcat he claimed 11 aerial victories, with 8 of those being confirmed by western sources. These include 4 MiG-23s, 2 Su-22s, 2 MiG 21 and 3 Mirage F1s. These totals make him the most successful Iranian fighter pilot, the most successful F-14 Tomcat pilot, and the most recent (and last man) to claim ace status.

Yadollah Javadpour flew the F-5 Freedom Fighter, another American made jet, and claimed five Iraqi aircraft shot down; two being reliably confirmed. This makes him an ace and the most successful F-5 fighter pilot, but his greatest claim to fame happened on August 6, 1983 when he shot down an Iraqi MiG-25. This was a significant achievement for an F-5 pilot, as the MiG-25 is a much bigger and faster aircraft with a substantial altitude advantage. His other confirmed kill was an Su-20 on October 17, 1980.

Inventory 1920–1979

Gallery

References

Bibliography

Further reading

External links

 Historical memorial site for the Imperial Iranian Air Force

Air force
Islamic Republic of Iran Air Force
Iranian Air Force
Air Force
Aviation history of Iran